Sefer Turan (born 1962 Afşin, Kahramanmaras, Turkey) is a Turkish journalist and author. Turan was educated in Egypt and he knows Arabic very well.

Career 

Sefer Turan is one of the few Middle East experts in Turkey. He served as a head of foreign news department at the Channel 7 TV station. He prepared and presented "the East & West" program at the ULKE TV.

Turan monitored Afghanistan and Iraq wars. His most remarkable works are on Palestine case. He prepared programs on Second Intifada, Palestine-Israel and Lebanon-Israel conflicts.

Sefer Turan attends as a political commentator on international TV Programs such as Al Jazeera, BBC Arabic, Rusiya Al-Yaum. He is appointed to the post of coordinator at state channel TRT el Türkiye which started broadcasting in Arabic He is currently serving as the chief advisor in Prime Minister Recep Tayyip Erdogan's office. He has written several articles supporting the Egyptian Islamic Jihad, listed by the United Nations Security Council as an al-Qaeda-affiliated group.

Sefer Turan married and he has three children.

Bibliography 

 Jerusalem: Heart of the history  (2004)
 My travels (2006)
 Historian of sciences: Fuat Sezgin (2010)

External links 
 Qantara: New Arabic Station Aims to Unite Turkish and Arab Worlds - Interview with Sefer Turan
 Turkey uses TV to seduce Arab world
 Abdulhamid Bilici: Selamün aleyküm min İstanbul!
 Ennahar: TV, Turkey's new weapon to win over the Arab world

References

1962 births
Living people
Turkish journalists